Citizen Khan is a British sitcom produced by the BBC and created by Adil Ray. Five series have been shown so far. It is set in Sparkhill, South Birmingham, described by its lead character, a British Pakistani man Mr Khan (Ray), as "the capital of British Pakistan". Citizen Khan follows the trials and tribulations of Mr Khan, a loud-mouthed, patriarchal, cricket-loving, self-appointed community leader, and his long suffering wife (played by Shobu Kapoor) and daughters Shazia (Maya Sondhi 2012–2014, Krupa Pattani 2015–2016) and Alia (Bhavna Limbachia). In Series One, Kris Marshall starred as Dave, the manager of Mr Khan's local mosque. The first name of Mrs Khan is Razia; however, Mr Khan's first name is never revealed.

The title of the show is a play on the title of the Orson Welles film Citizen Kane. The character Mr Khan had already featured in the BBC Two comedy series Bellamy's People, on BBC Radio 4's Down the Line and on his own online series on the BBC Comedy website. On 27 September 2012, the BBC announced that Citizen Khan had been commissioned for a second series. On 2 December 2013, BBC controller Charlotte Moore announced that Citizen Khan had been renewed for a third series which began airing on 31 October 2014. On 11 December 2014, BBC comedy controller Shane Allen announced that a fourth series had been commissioned. On 14 October 2015, the official Facebook page of Citizen Khan confirmed through a video of Mr Khan that the fourth series would begin on 30 October 2015. On 20 January 2016, it was confirmed the show would return for a fifth and final series which started airing on 4 November 2016.

Although Adil Ray is a Muslim, the show has divided opinion on whether its humour is a mockery of followers of that religion and of stereotyping British Pakistanis. Ray maintains that Mr Khan is a comic character who is intended for families of any ethnic background to relate to, as with other British family sitcoms.

Broadcast and reception
The first episode of Citizen Khan was first broadcast on BBC One on 27 August 2012, in a late timeslot of 10:20pm. It received what Digital Spy referred to as an "impressive" 3.41 million viewers and 20.9% of the audience.

The Independents Hasnet Lais stated "Credit must be given to Adil Ray for not sparing any sacred cows and shining light on the conundrum of some British Muslim women under the patriarchal cosh."

The BBC received over 700 complaints following the airing of the first episode with a further 20 complaints to Ofcom. Some British Muslims claimed that the show "ridicules" and "insults" Islam. The BBC claimed it had evidence the complaints were part of a lobbying campaign and countered it saying a number of people, including those of Muslim communities, praised the show and referred to its audience figures as a "very positive start."

The Independents Arifa Akbar commented negatively on its many clichéd jokes and character traits and drawing many comparisons with 1970s-style sitcoms. Mark Jones of The Guardian was more optimistic, describing it as "an affable enough debut, deserving a wider audience than this post-watershed slot is likely to attract."

The Islam Channel broadcast a special show entitled Politics and Media: Citizen Khan – Racist stereotypes or harmless fun? Presenter John Rees discussed whether the BBC comedy was stereotyping Muslims, or whether it was fun and could be laughed about by Muslims.

By the second episode, broadcast on 3 September, Citizen Khan clips had gone viral. Opinion outside the United Kingdom was also mixed, resulting in many heated debates. Outside of the UK, the Pakistani newspaper The News International criticised the BBC's use of Pakistani flags in the Khan's home, and Mr Khan's younger daughter quickly putting on a hijab and pretending to read the Qur'an. The Pakistan News Watch website countered "shows like Citizen Khan are essential in multicultural societies and help put all communities on an equal footing – if everyone can have a laugh at everyone else's expense, then no one can claim superiority." The debate continued for a third week, with the Yorkshire Post publishing an article by Pakistani journalist Sabbiyah Pervez appealing to her own community to "stop being so defensive and learn to laugh at itself."

The BBC ordered a seven-episode second series on 27 September 2012 due to good ratings. On 18 September 2013, the BBC announced that the second series would air on Friday nights in the prime time 9.30pm slot from 4 October.

In an interview with The Guardian, Adil Ray stated "What I've intended to do with Citizen Khan is a good thing – to make Mr Khan a good character, to make him universal and a communication between different communities."

Series 3 of Citizen Khan gained an audience of around 5 million per episode, including iPlayer views. Ahead the Series 4 debut in October 2015, Vicky Power of The Daily Telegraph stated "It's harmless, friendly fun for the whole family." Series 4 of Citizen Khan made its debut on 30 October 2015. The series attracted a record 3.3 million viewers.

Citizen Khan has been exported to Australia, India, Russia, Bulgaria and New Zealand, spawned Christmas specials and prompted a UK-wide "live" tour of regional theaters. Speaking to The Daily Telegraph in 2015 ahead of the launch of series 4, Adil Ray stated that fans of the show realise it is a "big laugh out loud comedy, not a reflection of every Muslim or Pakistani family in the country."

From Series 4, the role of Shazia Khan was taken over by Krupa Pattani replacing Maya Sondhi.

Ray reported that he received death threats for the show, including one threatening a riot. He has stated that his influences came from comedies such as Only Fools and Horses and Fawlty Towers that were aimed at family audiences, and he desires for families of all backgrounds to be able to see elements of Khan's character in their father figure. Ray has claimed that for every complaint he had over a scene in which Khan's daughter Alia hurriedly covers her head in the presence of her father, he received ten messages from Muslims, Catholics and Jews relating to the experience of a child behaving similarly.

In April 2016, the show was condemned in parliament by Rupa Huq, the Labour MP for Ealing Central and Acton, who called its portrayal of a Birmingham Muslim family "quite backward".

In June 2021, Ray was in a debate on Good Morning Britain about 'woke' comedy rows, and stated that the BBC was thinking about making a Christmas Special, but conversations would need to be had about the content and 'offensive stereotypes'.

Awards
 2014 – Royal Television Society, Best performance in a comedy – Adil Ray
 2014 – Royal Television Society, Best comedy programme – Citizen Khan
 2013 – Asian Media Awards, Best TV character – Citizen Khan
 2013 – Royal Television Society, Best performance in a comedy – Adil Ray
 2013 – Royal Television Society, Best Comedy Programme – Citizen Khan

Appearances
The character of Mr Khan has made appearances at Children in Need 2014 (in which he appeared as a guest in the EastEnders pub), The Queen Victoria, Comic Relief 2015, (in which he joked he was hoping to be considered for Jeremy Clarkson's job at Top Gear), the FA Cup Final 2015 (supporting local Birmingham team Aston Villa), and in October 2015, took over the train announcements at Birmingham New Street station for an hour. On Friday 18 November 2016, the cast of Citizen Khan made an appearance on Children in Need in a live sketch, Citizen Khan v Citizen Kane, in which they were joined by comedian Russell Kane and his family for a dance off. On 11 March 2017, Adil Ray appeared as Mr Khan on Let's Sing and Dance for Comic Relief as a judge.

Episodes

Characters

Episode count is as of 23 December 2016 (Series 5, Episode 7)

Ratings 
Total viewers include overnight views plus views on BBC iPlayer, BBC HD and recorded catch-up services. Official accurate figures are released 10 days after original transmission by BARB. For instance, Citizen Khan Series 2 Episode 1 attracted overall figures of 4.53m, a consolidated share of 15.1% including 1.17 million BBC iPlayer requests.

Distribution

DVD

Broadcasts
Premiering on 12 July 2013, the series airs on Comedy Central India in India. In the United Kingdom, reruns of the show air on Gold.

Digital
Series 1, 2 & 3 are available to buy on iTunes in both Standard Definition and High Definition, "A Khan Christmas" and "A Khan Family Christmas" have also been made available to buy.

Series 1 to 5 are available to stream on Amazon Prime and BBC iPlayer

See also

These are programmes with a similar premise.
 Fresh Off the Boat
 The Family Law
 Kim's Convenience
 Brown Nation
 Goodness Gracious Me
 The Kumars at No. 42
 The Real McCoy (TV series)

References

External links
 
 
 
 

2010s British sitcoms
2012 British television series debuts
2016 British television series endings
Asian-British culture
BBC television sitcoms
British Pakistani mass media
English-language television shows
Islam in fiction
Islamic comedy and humor
Ethnic humour
Pakistani diaspora in the United Kingdom
Television shows set in Birmingham, West Midlands
Religious comedy television series
Television series about Islam
Stereotypes of South Asian people